The 1988 DFB-Pokal Final decided the winner of the 1987–88 DFB-Pokal, the 45th season of Germany's premier football cup. It was played on 28 May 1988 at the Olympiastadion in West Berlin.

Route to the final

Match

Details

References

External links
 Match report at kicker.de 
 Match report at WorldFootball.net
 Match report at Fussballdaten.de 

Eintracht Frankfurt matches
VfL Bochum matches
1987–88 in German football cups
1988
1980s in West Berlin
May 1988 sports events in Europe
Football competitions in Berlin
Sports competitions in West Berlin